PST may refer to:

Time zones 
 Pacific Standard Time, UTC−08:00 (western North America)
 Pakistan Standard Time (usually PKT), UTC+05:00
 Philippine Standard Time (also PhST or PHT), UTC+08:00

Science and technology 
 Lead scandium tantalate, a ceramic material
 Partial stroke testing of valves
 Penoscrotal transposition, in medicine
 Personal Storage Table, a file format used in Microsoft applications
 Planar separator theorem, in graph theory
 Pocket set theory, in mathematics
 Post-stall technology, aircraft control system
 Program structure tree, in computer programming
PstLM, short-term light flicker metric
 Puccinia striiformis f.sp. tritici, or Wheat yellow rust

Economics and taxes 
 The Prebisch–Singer thesis or Prebisch–Singer hypothesis
 Provincial Sales Tax, a sales tax in some Canadian provinces

Places 
 Trail of Remembrance and Comradeship, a walkway in Ljubljana, Slovenia
 Poznań Fast Tram, Poland
 Prestonpans railway station, East Lothian, Scotland, station code

Other uses 
 Planescape: Torment, a 1999 video game
 Norwegian Police Security Service
 Proto-Sino-Tibetan language